Mauro Persiani (born November 15, 1956 in Bologna) is a retired Italian professional football player.

The three games that he played for A.S. Roma in the 1975/76 season were his only Serie A appearances.    

He hit the crossbar in the last minutes of Roma-Juventus .

References

1956 births
Living people
Italian footballers
Serie A players
A.S. Roma players
Novara F.C. players
Benevento Calcio players
Frosinone Calcio players

Association football forwards